This is a list of Boston College Eagles football players in the NFL draft.

Key

Selections

References

Boston College

Boston College Eagles NFL draft